Yakov Alexandrovich Malik (11 February 1980) was a Soviet diplomat.

Biography 
Born in Ostroverkhovka village, Kharkov Governorate, Malik was educated at Kharkiv Institute of National Economy (1930). Then, he worked as an economist and the Communist Party's functionary in Kharkiv, since 1935 – in foreign affairs service in Moscow. He served as Ambassador in Japan from 1942 until 1945, the moment the Soviet government declared war on the Japanese Empire on Aug. 9. Malik was the Soviet ambassador to the United Nations from 1948 to 1952, and from 1968 to 1976.

At the time of the United Nations Security Council Resolution 82 on 25 June 1950, Malik was boycotting the presence of a Nationalist Chinese representative.  His absence enabled the resolution to pass unanimously with a 9–0 vote.

On the floor of the United Nations on 23 June 1951, he proposed an armistice in the Korean War between Red China and North Korea on one hand, and South Korea, the United States, and other United Nations forces on the other.

Malik is also well known for giving the USSR  justifications for the occupation of Czechoslovakia at the Security Council in August 1968. He vetoed the two resolutions regarding the invasion (resolution requesting the liberation of the arrested Czechoslovak politicians and the removal of the communist armies from Czechoslovakia and the resolution requiring the selection of Special Envoy to Czechoslovakia).

In 1955, as Soviet ambassador to the United Kingdom, he switched on the Blackpool Illuminations.

From 1967 to 1971 he was the head of the Africa department of the Soviet ministry of Foreign affairs. During this time he initiated the covert operation Bukran, which established a spy network in several African countries.

References

External links 
 
 

1906 births
1980 deaths
People from Kharkiv Oblast
People from Kharkov Governorate
Burials at Novodevichy Cemetery
Ambassador Extraordinary and Plenipotentiary (Soviet Union)
Permanent Representatives of the Soviet Union to the United Nations
Ambassadors of the Soviet Union to Japan
Ambassadors of the Soviet Union to the United Kingdom